Shabban Shahab-ud-Din (8 November 1909 – 6 January 1983) was an Indian field hockey player who competed in the 1936 Summer Olympics.

He was a member of the Indian field hockey team, which won the gold medal. He played four matches as forward.

References

External links 
 
 
 
 

1909 births
1983 deaths
Olympic field hockey players of India
Field hockey players at the 1936 Summer Olympics
Indian male field hockey players
20th-century Indian Muslims
Olympic gold medalists for India
Olympic medalists in field hockey
Medalists at the 1936 Summer Olympics